Round Rock Premium Outlets is a  shopping mall located in Round Rock, Texas located on .
It is owned and managed by Simon Property Group, and part of Simon's Premium Outlets family of outlet malls. The shopping center has 125 stores.

History 

References

External links 
 Mall website

Shopping malls in Austin, Texas
Premium Outlets
Shopping malls established in 2006